The 1985–86 Norwegian 1. Divisjon season was the 47th season of ice hockey in Norway. Ten teams participated in the league, and Stjernen won the championship.

Regular season

Playoffs

Kvalserien

External links 
 Norwegian Ice Hockey Federation

Nor
GET-ligaen seasons
1985 in Norwegian sport
1986 in Norwegian sport